Prasad is a Nepali language social drama romance film, directed by Dinesh Raut, written by Journalist turned writer Sushil Poudel and produced by Shuvash Thapa under the banner of Shuvash Thapa Production. The film stars Bipin Karki, Namrata Shrestha and Nischal Basnet in the lead roles.

Prasad was released on 7 December 2018.

Plot 
Baburam (Bipin Karki) and Narayani (Namrata Shrestha) are a happily married couple in a small village in Kathmandu but problems arise when they find out they can't have a baby. Ramesh (Nischal Basnet) is a friend of Baburam who appears to have his eyes on Narayani.

Cast 

 Bipin Karki as Babura
 Namrata Shrestha as Narayani
 Nischal Basnet as Ramesh

Production 
The film went into production in April, 2018. The film released a trailer in September 2018 with its title track "Lai Lai". The song became successful. The trailer of the film was released in November 2018.

Reception 
The film received mostly positive reviews from the critics. Online Khabar have praised the film for its realistic storyline and its impressive cinematography.

Soundtrack

Accolades

References

External links 
 

2018 films
2010s Nepali-language films
Nepalese romantic drama films
2018 romantic drama films